The Marnes de Bleville is a geological formation in France. It dates back to the Late Jurassic.

Vertebrate fauna

See also

 List of dinosaur-bearing rock formations

References

Jurassic System of Europe
Kimmeridgian Stage
Jurassic France